The 1957 French Grand Prix was a Formula One motor race held on 7 July 1957 at Rouen-Les-Essarts. It was race 4 of 8 in the 1957 World Championship of Drivers.

Classification

Qualifying

Race

Notes
 – Includes 1 point for fastest lap

Shared drive
 Car #24: Mike MacDowel (30 laps) and Jack Brabham (38 laps).

Championship standings after the race 
Drivers' Championship standings

Note: Only the top five positions are included.

References

French Grand Prix
French Grand Prix
1957 in French motorsport